Arne L. Haugen (born 25 July 1939 in Meldal) is a Norwegian politician for the Labour Party (AP). He represents Sør-Trøndelag in the Norwegian Parliament, where he meets in the place of Trond Giske, who was appointed to a government position.

He was mayor in Meldal from 1979 to 2005.

Parliamentary Committee duties 
2005 - 2009 member of the Standing Committee on Business and Industry.

External links

1939 births
Living people
People from Meldal
Labour Party (Norway) politicians
Members of the Storting
21st-century Norwegian politicians